Janet Osgerby (born 20 January 1963) was a retired British swimmer. Osgerby competed in two events at the 1980 Summer Olympics. At the ASA National British Championships she won the 100 metres butterfly title in 1981.

Her twin sister Ann Osgerby, was also an international swimmer.

References

External links
 

1963 births
Living people
British female swimmers
Olympic swimmers of Great Britain
Swimmers at the 1980 Summer Olympics
Sportspeople from Preston, Lancashire
Female butterfly swimmers
20th-century British women
21st-century British women